Universidad de los Andes ('University of the Andes') may refer to:

Universities
Los Andes Peruvian University, Peru
University of the Andes, Chile
University of Los Andes (Colombia)
University of the Andes (Venezuela)

Other uses
Universidad de Los Andes F.C., a Venezuelan football club